The following is the standings of the 2009–10 Iran 3rd Division football season. This is the 4th rated football competition in Iran after the Azadegan League,  Persian Gulf Cup and 2nd Division.

League standings

Group A

Group B

Group C

Group D

Group E

Group F

Second round

Group A

 Chooka Talesh  and  Behzisti Hamedan  Promoted to the 2nd Division

Group B

 Zob Ahan Novin Isfahan  and  Goal Navad Qa'em Shahr  Promoted to the 2nd Division

Group C

 Naft Omidiyeh  and  Ariyana Gostar Kish  Promoted to the 2nd Division

Final league standing

The championship round was played by the participation of the winners of groups A, B, and C.

Zob Ahan Novin Isfahan was chosen as the host of the matches.

References

League 3 (Iran) seasons
4